The 2011 United States Men's Curling Championship took place on February 12–19 at the Scheels Arena in Fargo, North Dakota. It was held in conjunction with the 2011 United States Women's Curling Championship. After a win over the Tyler George rink, Pete Fenson and his team became champions for the second consecutive time. They represented the United States at the 2011 World Championships in Regina, Saskatchewan, finishing in 10th place after an unfortunate series of close losses dropped their win–loss record to 3-8. It is the worst finish by an American men's team at the world championships to date.

Road to the Nationals

Teams qualified for the men's nationals in one of two ways. Two teams automatically qualified as the top two US teams on the Order of Merit list after the Curl Mesabi Cash Spiel is completed. This year, those two teams are the Pete Fenson and Tyler George rinks.

The remaining eight spots for the nationals were awarded to the top finishers in the regional qualifiers and challenge rounds. Five teams qualified from the qualifiers round, where each qualified site received one or more qualifying spots. The other three spots went to the winners of the challenge round.

Teams

Round-robin standings
Through Draw 9

Round-robin results
All times listed in Central Standard Time.

Draw 1
Saturday, February 12, 8:30 pm

Draw 2
Sunday, February 13, 12:00 pm

Draw 3
Sunday, February 13, 8:00 pm

Draw 4
Monday, February 14, 12:00 pm

Draw 5
Monday, February 14, 8:00 pm

Draw 6
Tuesday, February 15, 2:30 pm

Draw 7
Wednesday, February 16, 8:00 am

Draw 8
Wednesday, February 16, 4:00 pm

Draw 9
Thursday, February 17, 8:00 am

Playoffs

1 vs. 2 game
Friday, February 18, 12:00 pm

3 vs. 4 game
Friday, February 18, 12:00 pm

Semifinal
Friday, February 18, 8:00 pm

Championship final
Saturday, February 19, 3:00 pm

Fenson opened up the final of the men's championship with a draw against two to barely secure shot rock, scoring a single in the first end. George came back with a draw for three after Fenson threw a draw too heavy, taking an early lead after the third. Fenson responded with a hit and stick shot to score a deuce, and George drew to the button for a single in the fifth. After the break, Fenson blanked two ends before a heavy draw in the eighth left him with only one point, tying the game. Fenson forced George to take a single in the ninth end, giving George the lead, but Fenson tied the game in the final end with a takeout. In the extra end, Fenson drew to the eight-foot circle with his last stone, and George's hammer stone crashed on a rock in the top twelve-foot, leaving Fenson a steal of one point and the win.

References

External links
2011 USA Nationals Home Page
Results on CurlingZone.com

United States Mens Curling Championship, 2011
United States Mens Curling Championship, 2011
United States National Curling Championships
Sports in Fargo, North Dakota
Curling competitions in North Dakota
2011 in sports in North Dakota